Mataquescuintla (from Nahuatl, meaning net to catch dogs) is a town and municipality in the Jalapa department of south-east Guatemala.

Mataquescuintla played a significant role during the first half of the nineteenth century, when it was the center of operations of conservative general Rafael Carrera, who led a Catholic peasant revolution against the liberal government of Mariano Gálvez in 1838, and then ruled Guatemala from 1840 until his death in 1865.

It is divided into 6 zones.

Toponymy

The toponym "Mataquescuintla" comes from Nahuatl, and is composed of the words "matatl" (meaning "net bag"), "Itzcuintli" (meaning "dog") and "tlan" (meaning: "abundance"), and means "net to catch dogs".

History

The first settlers in Mataquescuintla were Pipils that came from the province of El Salvador.

After Central American independence

In the 1825 Constitution of Guatemala, Mataquescuintla was established as part of Cuilapa, in District 3; also in Cuilapa are Los Esclavos, Oratorio, Concepción, La Vega, El Pino, Los Verdes, Los Arcos, Corral de Piedra, San Juan de Arana, El Zapote, Santa Rosa, Las Casillas, and Epaminondas.

Overthrow of Mariano Gálvez

In 1837, an armed struggle began against the regime of Francisco Morazán, president of the Federal Republic of Central America, a political entity that included Guatemala, Comayagua (later named Honduras), El Salvador, Nicaragua and Costa Rica. The rebellion also fought against those who governed the State of Guatemala, like Chief of State Mariano Gálvez. The leader of the insurgency was Rafael Carrera; among its forces were numerous natives, since on 9 June 1837, the State of Guatemala had reintroduced indigenous populations that had been suppressed since colonial times by the Cortes of Cádiz. The insurgents began hostilities by means of a guerrilla war: attacking populations without giving them an opportunity to have meetings with government troops. At the same time, Gálvez's clerical enemies spread ideas, accusing him of poisoning river water to spread cholera morbus, which hadn't happened even with the large population growth and the poor health structure in the region. The accusation, however, was beneficial to Carrera, putting a large part of the population against Mariano Gálvez and liberals in general.

Standing out among the battles of Carrera: in the barracks at Mataquescuintla; at Ambelis in Santa Rosa, defeating the army commanded by Teodoro Mejía; on 7 December 1837 in the plaza at Jalapa where he was defeated; and on 13 January 1838 where the Garrison of Guatemala was attacked. Some of these military events were accompanied by robberies, robberies, searches and murders of defenseless people. In particular, the Gálvez government, upon learning that Carrera was the leader of the revolt, invaded Mataquescuintla and captured his wife, Petrona Álvarez, whom the soldiers seized by force. When Carrera heard of this, he vowed to avenge his wife, and newly accompanied by her, restarted the fight with new vigor. Petrona Álvarez, inflamed with the desire for revenge, committed numerous atrocities against the liberal troops, to the point that many of Carrera's coreligionists feared her more than the caudillo himself, although by that time Carrera had already showed his military leadership and expertise that would come to later characterize him.

The fight had taken on the form of holy war, for it was the parish priests of the secular clergy who argued for the peasants to defend religious rights and to fight against the liberal atheists; Carrera had been educated by the parish priest of Mataquescuintla who taught Catholicism and started to worry about the liberals' power. Another factor that influenced the revolt were the concessions given by the liberal government of Francisco Morazán to the English—whom they called "heretics" because they were Protestants. In Guatemala, they had been given Belize and San Jerónimo in Salamá—which was an expensive and profitable property that the liberals had seized from the Dominicans in 1829. The contraband English items from Belize had impoverished the artisan Guatemalans, who joined Carrera's revolt. The priests announced to the natives that Carrera was their protector angel, who had descended from the heavens to take revenge on heretics, liberals, and aliens, and to restore their ancient dominion. They devised various tricks to make the natives believe this, which were announced as miracles. Among them, a letter was thrown from the roof of one of the churches, in the middle of a vast congregation of natives. This letter supposedly came from the Virgin Mary, who commissioned Carrera to lead a revolt against the government.

To counteract the violent attacks made by peasant guerrillas, Gálvez approved and then praised the use of a scorched earth policy against the uprising peoples. Several of his supporters advised him to desist from this tactic, because it would only contribute to increasing hostility. In early 1838, José Francisco Barrundia, the liberal leader of Guatemala, disillusioned with Galvez's management, managed to bring Guatemala City under Carrera's command, and fought the head of state. Later that year, the situation in Guatemala became unsustainable: the economy was paralyzed by the lack of security and roads, and the liberals negotiated with Carrera to end the warring. Gálvez left power 31 January 1838, before an "Army of the People", giving control to Rafael Carrera that initiated the battle in Guatemala City with an army of between ten thousand and twelve thousand men, after the agreement left Carrera against Barrundia.

Carrera's troops victorious, they shouted "Long live religion!" and "Away with foreign heretics!" Consisting mainly of poorly armed peasants, they took Guatemala City by force pillaged and destroyed the liberal government buildings, including the Archbishop's Palace, where Gálvez had resided, and the house of the English presenter William Hall. On 2 March 1838, Gálvez's absence was unanimously accepted in Congress, and after a period of uncertainty, Rafael Carrera came to power, although first would suffer some defeats.

Creation of Santa Rosa department

The Republic of Guatemala began under President General Rafael Carrera on 21 March 1847 so that the former State of Guatemala could freely trade with foreign nations. On 25 February 1848, the Mita region was separated from the department of Chiquimula, into its own department, and divided into three districts: Jutiapa, Santa Rosa and Jalapa. The Santa Rosa department included Santa Rosa as the capital, and Cuajiniquilapa, Chiquimulilla, Guazacapán, Taxisco, Pasaco, Nancinta, Tecuaco, Sinacantán, Isguatán, Sacualpa, La Leona, Jumay and Mataquescuintla.

After the Liberal Revolution

After the Liberal Revolution of 1871, liberals began to negatively recount the Carrera regime.

In 1889, Mataquescuintla was scene of an uprising led by colonel Hipólito Ruano against the government of general Manuel Lisandro Barillas Bercián. Opposing policies set up Barillas, Ruano and other retired soldiers rose up in arms, and quickly stopped by the government. Ruano was captured and shot in Mataquescuintla Square.

On 3 September 1935, Mataquescuintla left the department of Santa Rosa and was incorporated in the department of Jalapa. On 29 October 1850 the village was elevated to become a town.

Government

The municipalities are regulated by various laws of the Republic, which establish their form of organization, administrative bodies, and their taxes. Although they are autonomous entities, they are subject to national legislation and the main laws that govern them since 1985 are:

The municipal government is in charge of a Municipal Council while the municipal code—an ordinary law containing provisions that apply to all municipalities—establishes that "the municipal council is the highest collegiate body for deliberation and decision of the municipalities ... and has its seat in the district of the principal municipality"; article 33 of the aforementioned code establishes that "it is the exclusive responsibility of the municipal council to exercise the government of the municipality."

The municipal council works with the mayor, the trustees, and councilors, and is elected directly for a period of four years, and can be re-elected. There are also Auxiliary Community Development Committees (COCODE), Municipal Development Committee (COMUDE), as well as cultural associations and work commissions. Auxiliary mayors are elected by the communities according to their own set of principles and traditions, and meet with the municipal mayor on the first Sunday of each month, while the Community Development Committees and the Municipal Development Committee organize and facilitate the participation of they community's prioritizing needs and problems. The mayor from 2012 to 2016 was Hugo Manfredo Loy.

Geography

Climate
Mataquescuintla has a Köppen climate classification of Cwb.

Location

It is located north of San Rafael Las Flores, Casillas, Santa Rosa de Lima and Nueva Santa Rosa in Santa Rosa, east of San José Pinula in Guatemala Department, west of San Carlos Alzatate in Jalapa, and south of Sansare in El Progreso and Palencia in Guatemala Department. It is very near Ayarza Lagoon and an abandoned bismuth mine.

Notes

References

Bibliography

 
 
 
 
 
 
 
 
 
 
 
 
 
 
 
 
 
 
 
 
 
 
 
 
 

Municipalities of the Jalapa Department
Rafael Carrera